The 1990 IIHF Women's World Championships was an international women's ice hockey competition held at the Civic Centre in Ottawa, Ontario, Canada (now renamed the TD Place Arena) from March 19 to 25, in 1990. This was the first IIHF-sanctioned international tournament in women's ice hockey and is the only major international tournament in women's ice hockey to allow bodychecking. Full contact bodychecking was allowed with certain restrictions near the boards. The intermissions between periods were twenty minutes instead of fifteen. This has since been changed to the usual fifteen minutes.

The Canadian team won the gold medal, the United States won silver, and Finland won bronze. Team Finland had won the first IIHF European Women’s Championship the previous year (1989), in Düsseldorf and Ratingen, Germany.

Canada's Fran Rider helped to organize the championships without the financial support from the Canadian Amateur Hockey Association (now known as Hockey Canada).

The tournament drew strong international attention. The gold medal game packed 9,000 people into the arena and drew over a million viewers on television. For marketing purposes, the Canadian Amateur Hockey Association decided the Canadian national team should wear pink and white uniforms instead of the expected red and white and released a related film called, "Pretty in Pink". While the experiment only lasted for this tournament, Ottawa was taken over by a "pink craze" during the championships. Restaurants had pink-coloured food on special, and pink became a popular colour for flowers and bow ties.

Qualification Tournament
The United States, Canadian and Asian representative Japan, qualified automatically.
The 1989 European Women's Ice Hockey Championship served as the qualification tournament for this championship. The top five finishers in the top pool qualified. They were Finland, Norway, Sweden, Switzerland, and West Germany.

U.S. team members ranged in age from 17 to 30 and included high school and college players, a law student and a construction worker.

Venue
The tournament took place in Canada at the Civic Centre in Ottawa, now renamed, TD Place Arena.

Final tournament

Group stage

Group A

Group B

Consolation round

5–8 place

7–8 place

5–6 place

Final round

Semifinals

3–4 place

Final

Rankings and statistics

Final rankings

Scoring leaders
List shows the top ten skaters sorted by points, then goals.

Canada's Dawn McGuire was named MVP of the gold medal game.

Leading goaltenders
Only the top five goaltenders, based on save percentage, who have played 40% of their team's minutes are included in this list.
TOI = Time On Ice (minutes:seconds); SA = Shots against; GA = Goals against; GAA = Goals against average; Sv% = Save percentage; SO = ShutoutsSource: whockey.com

Bodychecking

This is the only major international tournament in women's ice hockey to allow bodychecking. Bodychecking rules allowed for full-contact checking, with certain limitations along the boards.

Before the tournament, bodychecking had been allowed in women's ice hockey in Europe and North America though Canada had begun to gradually eliminate the tactic from their women's ice hockey programs in the mid-1980's, with contact having already been banned at all national women's ice hockey tournaments in Canada in 1983 due to the efforts of Rhonda Leeman Taylor. However, the European teams had asked for bodychecking to be included in the 1990 international tournament.

After this tournament, the International Ice Hockey Federation disallowed bodychecking in women's ice hockey. It is currently an infraction punished with a minor or major and game misconduct penalty.

Injuries

A number of players suffered head injuries from the beginning of the tournament. Finland's Kirsi Hirvonen was "carried away with a neck injury after being cross-checked." U.S. team captain Tina Cardinale-Beauchemin's right forearm and elbow, "were a mass of purple-and-blue welts, courtesy of a slash early in the tournament." Canada's France Saint-Louis, "spent three days in a hospital after taking a stick across the throat".

See also

 IIHF World Women's Championships

Notes

References
 Malcolm G. Kelly, "The Complete Idiot's Guide to Canadian Sports History and Trivia", Alpha Books, .

External links
 Summary from the Women's Hockey Net
 Detailed summary from passionhockey.com

IIHF Women's World Ice Hockey Championships
Ice hockey competitions in Ottawa
World
World
1990
March 1990 sports events in Canada
1990s in Ottawa
1990 in Ontario
Women's ice hockey competitions in Canada